Evergreen is a rural town and locality in the Toowoomba Region, Queensland, Australia.

Geography 
The Oakey–Cooyar Road runs through from south-west to north-east.

History 
Evergreen Provisional School opened on 17 June 1895. On 1 January 1909 it became Evergreen State School. It closed on 13 December 1996. Opened as a provisional school in 1895 and was proclaimed a state school on 1 Jan 1909. It closed in 1996. It was at 3616 Oakey Cooyar Road.

King's Hill Provisional School opened on 1917. On 1 July 1918, it became King's Hill State School. It closed circa 1926.

Berndale Provisional School opened on 13 November 1922. On 1 August 1924, it became Berndale State School. It closed in 1956.

Education 
There are no schools in Evergreen. The nearest government primary school is Kulpi State School in neighbouring Kulpi to the south. The nearest government secondary school is Peranga State School in neighbouring Peranga to the west which offers secondary education to Year 10. For secondary education to Year 12, the nearest government school is Oakey State High School in Oakey to the south.

References 

Towns in Queensland
Toowoomba Region
Localities in Queensland